Mac Dre's the Name is the fifth studio album by Bay Area rapper Mac Dre released on June 13, 2001.

The title track is not to be confused with an earlier track of the same name, which appeared on Mac Dre's debut EP Young Black Brotha in 1989.

Track listing
"Mac Dre's the Name"
"Shakin' the Feds"
"From Sac 2 tha Boonies"
"Northside"
"Throw"
"Neva Gonna Fade Us"
"Doin' What I Do"
"Be About Your Doe"
"The Game Is Thick"
"Nobody Moves, Nobody Gets Hurt"
"I Gotta Go" (featuring Marvaless)
"Dangerous" (featuring Bad Azz & Daz Dillinger)

2001 albums
Mac Dre albums
Gangsta rap albums by American artists